Ibuka may refer to:

People
Ibuka Kajinosuke (1854-1935), Japanese samurai, ordained minister and educator of the late Edo period
Yae Ibuka (1897–1989), Japanese nurse 
Masaru Ibuka(1908-1997), Japanese electronics industrialist and co-founder of Sony

Other
 Ibuka (organisation), an umbrella organisation of groups that aid survivors of the 1994 Rwandan Genocide

Japanese-language surnames